Collins reagent is the complex of chromium(VI) oxide with pyridine in dichloromethane. This metal-pyridine complex, a red solid, is used to oxidize primary alcohols to the corresponding aldehydes and secondary alcohols to the corresponding ketones. 
This complex is a hygroscopic orange solid.

Synthesis and structure
The complex is produced by treating chromium trioxide with pyridine.  The complex is diamagnetic. According to X-ray crystallography, the complex is 5-coordinate with mutually trans pyridine ligands.  The Cr-O and Cr-N distances are respectively 163 and 215 picometers.

In terms of history, the complex was first produced by Sisler et al.

Reactions
Collins reagent is especially useful for oxidations of acid sensitive compounds. Primary and secondary alcohols are oxidized respectively to aldehydes and ketones in yields of 87-98%.

Like other oxidations by Cr(VI), the stoichiometry of the oxidations is complex because the metal undergoes 3e reduction and the substrate is oxidized by 2 electrons:
3 RCH2OH + 2 CrO3(pyridine)2 → 3 RCHO + 3 H2O + Cr2O3 + 4 pyridine
The reagent is typically used in a sixfold excess. Methylene chloride is the typical solvent, with the solubility of 12.5 g/100 ml.

The application of this reagent to oxidations was discovered by G. I. Poos, G. E. Arth, R. E. Beyler and L.H. Sarett in 1953. It was popularized by J. C. Collins several years later.

Other reagents
 Sarett oxidation
 Oxidation with chromium(VI)-amine complexes
Collins reagent can be used as an alternative to the Jones reagent and pyridinium chlorochromate (PCC) when oxidizing secondary alcohols to ketones. PCC and pyridinium dichromate (PDC) oxidations have largely supplanted Collins oxidation.

Safety and environmental aspects
The solid is flammable.  Generally speaking chromium (VI) compounds are carcinogenic.

References

Oxidizing agents
Chromium(VI) compounds